Björn J:son Lindh (born Björn Lindh; 25 October 1944 – 21 December 2013) was a Swedish flautist, pianist, music arranger, composer and artist. He worked in such diverse musical styles as jazz, classical, fusion, rock, prog rock and ethno. He composed for instance chamber music, symphonic works, concertos for various instruments and choirs as well as film scores for feature films and TV series in Scandinavia. J:son Lindh scored music for films such as Mannen på taket, directed by Bo Widerberg and Jägarna, directed by Kjell Sundvall.

Björn J:son Lindh's ancestors family name was Jansson for several generations. His father changed the family name to Lindh in 1931. The name combination J:son Lindh, where J:son originates from the family name Jansson, has been used since then, but was only in 2009 approved by the Swedish Patent and Registration Office as a family name.

Career
In 1962, Björn J:son Lindh started his music education at Ingesund College of Music in Arvika. Between 1963 and 1971 he studied both piano and flute at the Royal Swedish Academy of Music (today Royal College of Music) in Stockholm. J:son Lindh started his professional career as a pop musician during the 1960s in the group Atlantic Ocean, but he was also active as a studio musician during the 1960s and 1970s. During the 1970s, J:son Lindh played in several groups, for instance Jason's Fleece, Handgjort, Baltik and Ablution. In 1973 he started the group Hörselmat together with Janne Schaffer and the group was still active during the 1980s. He played on many of Ralph Lundsten's albums during the 1970s and 1980s, and he also played with the classical pianist Staffan Scheja during the 1980s. The albums he recorded with Scheja was called the Europa-suite. J:son Lindh's first solo album Ramadan was released in 1971, and in 1972 the record companies Metronome and CTI Records released the album in U.S. The artist name he used in U.S. was "Jayson Lindh". His first U.S. release on Vanguard's Free Style label, A Day at the Surface, was recorded at Sonet Records in Stockholm in 1978 and included for instance Janne Schaffer, the Gambian percussionist Malando Gassama, Pete Robinson on period synthesizer, and Stefan Brolund on fender bass. In 1984 he played the flute solo on Murray Head's U.K. No. 1 single "One Night in Bangkok", taken from the Tim Rice/Benny Andersson/Björn Ulvaeus musical Chess. In 1986, he collaborated with the progressive new-age music group, Triangulus, on their self-titled album. He performed with musicians from other countries, for example on the album Islands by Mike Oldfield.

Although Björn J:son Lindh was a flautist, he frequently performed on the piano (or Fender Rhodes), and also made use of various synthesizers on many of his recordings. Some of his music is relatively experimental, using up-to-date technology and instruments of that time, such as the Synclavier which he made use of on the album Atlantis, together with Ralph Lundsten as engineer. He performed on Opeth's 2011 album Heritage, on the seventh track called Famine. He released about 30 solo albums during his career, and the piece of music that is most well known is probably "Brusa högre lilla å" (Sing Louder Little River).

J:son Lindh was also interested in visual art. He created graphic art by using copper ink, ink, watercolor and acrylic paint and he had several exhibitions since the middle of the 1990s.

He performed many times together with his wife  in the Church of Nora, Örebro County, where he was active until his death on 21 December 2013 in Nora of a brain tumor.

Awards and honors
1971 : Gold Record for Cornelis Vreeswijk's album Spring mot Ulla -spring!, as arranger and musician 
1971 : Gold Records for Cornelis Vreeswijk's double album Poem, ballader och lite blues, as arranger, composer and musician  
1971 : A second place at the international radio competition Prix Jean-Antoine Triumph Variety Show in Monte Carlo, with ”Musik från en storstad” from the album Från storstad till grodspad 
1976: Gold Record for the album Cous Cous
1984: Silver Record for the album Europa, together with Staffan Scheja
1985: Svenska Fonogrampriset for the album Europa, together with Staffan Scheja
1987: Grammis Award for the best Swedish instrumental album with Feather Nights 
1989: Platinum Records for the double album Den flygande holländaren, a tribute album to Cornelis Vreeswijk
1993: Cornelis Vreeswijk Scholarship 
2003: Culture Prize of Arvika Township, Sweden 
2006: SKAPs Music Drama Price
2010: Sweden's Sacred Choral Music Association's Medal of Merit Musica Sacra
2013: Flory Green Scholarship along with his wife Marie J:son Lindh Nordenmalm
2015: Culture Prize of Nora Township, Sweden (posthumously)

Discography – albums
1971 –  Ramadan (released in US and Germany 1972)
1971 –  Från storstad till grodspad
1972 –  Cous Cous (released in US, Netherlands and Spain 1973)
1973 –  Sissel (released in US 1974)
1974 –  Boogie Woogie (released in Netherlands 1974 and in Spain 1976. Was released in US 1975 with the title Second Carneval)
1976 –  Raggie (released in UK 1977 with the title Jayson Lindh)
1978 –  Bike Voyage II (released in US 1978 and in UK 1980 with the title A Day At The Surface)
1980 –  Våta vingar (released in UK with the title Wet Wings)
1981 –  Musik (released in UK with the title "To Be Continued...")
1983 –  Atlantis-Bilder från en ö (released in US, Canada and UK with the title Atlantis)
1984 –  Europa (Opus I) (together with Staffan Scheja)
1985 –  Spirits of Europa Opus II (together with Staffan Scheja. Released in US, Canada 1986 and Japan 1987 with the title Spirits Of Europa)
1985 –  Världen vänder
1986 –  Rhapsody Of Sweden
1987 –  Feather Nights
1987 –  Hörselmat med Gävleborgs Symfoniorkester
1989 –  Europa Opus III, Bridges (together with Staffan Scheja)
1989 –  Svensk rapsodi
1990 –  Tid Brusa (together with Janne Schaffer and Gunnar Idenstam)
1991 –  Spotlight – a compilation
1993 –  Profeten (text read by Peter Haber) 
1994 –  Brusa högre lilla å – a compilation (reissued 1999)
1998 –  Opus Europa-The Collection – a compilation (together with Staffan Scheja)
1999 –  In the Air (together with Gothenburg Opera Symphony Orchestra and Uppsala Chamber Soloists)
2000 –  Den hela människan (music from the film Hälsoresan. Together with Janne Schaffer and Electric Banana Band)
2000 –  Guldkorn – a compilation
2001 –  Inner Beauty (together with Torbjörn Carlsson)
2001 –  Mental avslappning
2002 –  Dansmeditation
2002 –  En dag på gården (Vestmanniaensemblen)
2002 –  Julglöd (together with Janne Schaffer, Leif Strand and Nacka Sångensemble)
2003 –  Till min kära (together with Torbjörn Carlsson and text read by Thorwald Olsson)
2005 –  Vinterhamn (together with Torbjörn Carlsson, Ted Ström, Marie J:son Lindh Nordenmalm and choirs from Nora)
2007 –  Clarity (together with Torbjörn Carlsson and Malin Trast)
2008 –  Samlat det bästa med Björn J:son Lindh – a compilation
2009 –  Orgel (together with Marie J:son Lindh Nordenmalm and Katarina Andreasson)
2010 –  Skymningsglöd (together with Torbjörn Carlsson, Malin Trast and Marie J:son Lindh Nordenmalm)
2011 –  Jul i Nora (together with Marie J:son Lindh Nordenmalm, choirs and musicians from Nora)
2013 –  LunchOrgel 12.12 (together with Marie J:son Lindh Nordenmalm)
2013 –  I vinden (together with Olli Strömberg)
2013 –  Blommorna (together with Stefan Blomquist, Torbjörn Carlsson and Dan Magnusson)

Selected film music
1971: Niklas och Figuren
1974: En enkel melodi
1975: Lejonet och jungfrun
1976: Mannen på taket
1978: Dante – akta're för Hajen! 
1982: Gräsänklingar
1984: Mannen från Mallorca
1985: Mask of Murder
1986: Bröderna Mozart
1988: Run for Your Life (also called Marathon)
1992: Den demokratiske terroristen
1994: Utmaningen
1996: Jägarna
1998: Cellophan
1999: Hälsoresan – En smal film av stor vikt (together with Janne Schaffer)
1999: Sjön
2004: Macbeth
2008: Vi hade i alla fall tur med vädret – igen!
2011: The Stig-Helmer Story (together with Janne Schaffer)

References

External links
Björn J:son Lindh Official site
Björn J:son Lindh - Website developed by the daughters Lotta and Sissel

Björn J:son Lindh at The Swedish Film Database
Björn J:son Lindh at Discogs
Björn J:son Lindh at AllMusic

1944 births
2013 deaths
Swedish male composers
Swedish flautists
Swedish pianists
Swedish film score composers
Male film score composers
Deaths from brain cancer in Sweden
Place of death missing
People from Arvika Municipality
20th-century pianists
Male pianists
20th-century Swedish male musicians
21st-century Swedish male musicians
CTI Records artists
20th-century flautists
21st-century flautists